Jacques Legras (16 October 1924 – 15 March 2006) was a French actor.

Selected filmography 

 Branquignol (1949) - Le domestique qui crie trop fort
 La patronne (1950) - Un témoin
 Bernard and the Lion (1951) - Paul
 Love Is Not a Sin (1952) - Vaugerel - membre de l'association
 La demoiselle et son revenant (1952) - Le duelliste
 The Three Musketeers (1953)
 Les hommes ne pensent qu'à ça (1954) - Le marié
 Service Entrance (1954) - Un client de Dumény (uncredited)
 Ah! Les belles bacchantes (1954) - Legras, l'annonceur du spectacle
 The Impossible Mr. Pipelet (1955) - Un pompier (uncredited)
 La Belle Américaine (1961) - Riri, le cafetier
 Une souris chez les hommes (1964) - Un inspecteur
 The Counterfeit Constable (1964) - L'agent Ben / Senephleph Mendoza
 Les gros bras (1964) - L'expert en bijouterie
 La grosse caisse (1965) - Le facteur
 La tête du client (1965) - Le chauffeur de taxi
 La communale (1965)
 Les Bons Vivants (1965) - Un client suisse (segment "Fermeture, La") (uncredited)
 Lady L (1965) - Un inspecteur de police
 Your Money or Your Life (1966) - Tapu
 Trois enfants dans le désordre (1966) - Barnachon
 The Big Restaurant (1966) - L'agent de police
 Atout coeur à Tokyo pour OSS 117 (1966) - M. Chan
 Woman Times Seven (1967) - Salesman (segment "Snow") (uncredited)
 The Little Bather (1968) - Henri Castagnier (le curé)
 Faites donc plaisir aux amis (1969) - L'inspecteur Ludovic Grossard
 L'auvergnat et l'autobus (1969) - Le clerc
 Hibernatus (1969) - L'avocat
 L'ardoise (1970) - Le passant (uncredited)
 L'étalon (1970) - Pointard
 Un été sauvage (1970)
 The Lady in the Car with Glasses and a Gun (1970) - Policeman
 The Married Couple of the Year Two (1971) - Le préposé au divorce (uncredited)
 Law Breakers (1971) - L'inspecteur du magasin (uncredited)
 On est toujours trop bon avec les femmes (1971) - Le receveur (uncredited)
 Daisy Town (1971) - (voice)
 Sex-shop (1972) - Albert
 Les Charlots font l'Espagne (1972) - Le conducteur
 Elle court, elle court la banlieue (1973) - Le représentant
 A Slightly Pregnant Man (1973) - Leboeuf, le marchand de télévisions
 Le permis de conduire (1974) - L'examinateur / L'expert
 The Holes (1974) - Bougras, l'hirondelle obséquieuse
 Les quatre Charlots mousquetaires (1974) - Alexandre Dumas / L'écrivain
 La gueule de l'emploi (1974) - Jacques Lelièvre
 Les Charlots en folie: À nous quatre Cardinal! (1974) - Alexandre Dumas
 Vos gueules les mouettes! (1974) - M. Le Marlec, député-maire, le recteur de Saint-On
 L'intrépide (1975) - Le contrôleur des wagons-lits
 Catherine et Cie (1975)
 Le trouble-fesses (1976)
 Le roi des bricoleurs (1977) - Sirop
 Drôles de zèbres (1977) - Jardine, le directeur de l'hôtel
 Parisian Life (1977) - Alphonse
 La Ballade des Dalton (1978) - Augustus Betting, le notaire (voice)
 Le beaujolais nouveau est arrivé (1978)
 Heroes Are Not Wet Behind the Ears (1978) - L'agent étranger
 The Associate (1979) - Inspecteur Pernais
 Le piège à cons (1979) - Le commissaire Roubert
 La Gueule de l'autre (1979) - Hervé Bidart
 Mais qu'est-ce que j'ai fait au bon Dieu pour avoir une femme qui boit dans les cafés avec les hommes ? (1980) - Maurice Vasselin, l'agent du fisc
 Le jour se lève et les conneries commencent (1981) - Charles Landrieux
 Les Bidasses aux grandes manœuvres (1981) - Colonel allemand
 Te marre pas... c'est pour rire! (1982) - L'huissier
 N'oublie pas ton père au vestiaire... (1982) - Le policier
 L'été de nos quinze ans (1983) - Le 'satyre' du cinéma
 Les malheurs d'Octavie (1983) - Gonzague, directeur des services secrets
 Mon curé chez les Thaïlandaises (1983) - Monsieur Ping
 Vous habitez chez vos parents? (1983) - Gaspard
 Retenez Moi...Ou Je Fais Un Malheur (1984) - Le chef d'orchestre
 Vive le fric ! (1985) - Le percepteur
 La gitane (1986) - Pilu
 Corps z'a corps (1988) - Thiriet
 How to Make Love to a Negro Without Getting Tired (1989) - Vendeur de machines à écrire
 Robin des mers (1998) - Jacques Pénalty
 Vidange (1998) - Le procureur

External links 
 
 Fragments d'un dictionnaire amoureux

1924 births
2006 deaths
Actors from Nantes
French male stage actors
French male film actors
French male television actors